William Swanson may refer to:

William H. Swanson (born 1949), chairman and chief executive officer of Raytheon Company
William Swanson (artist) (born 1970), Californian painter
William Swanson (politician) (1819–1903), New Zealand Member of Parliament and Member of the Legislative Council
Bill Swanson (baseball) (1888–1954), United States Major League Baseball player